Lasionycta subfumosa is a moth of the family Noctuidae. It is found from Victoria Island and Banks Island in the Northwest Territories and the Darby Mountains on the Seward Peninsula of Alaska.

It is a diurnal species.

Adults are on wing from late June through July.

External links
A Revision of Lasionycta Aurivillius (Lepidoptera, Noctuidae) for North America and notes on Eurasian species, with descriptions of 17 new species, 6 new subspecies, a new genus, and two new species of Tricholita Grote

Lasionycta
Moths described in 1920